Canberk Kuş (born August 12, 1996) is a Turkish professional basketball player who plays as a Small forward for Darüşşafaka of the Basketbol Süper Ligi (BSL).

Education
 Fethiye Basketball Club (2011–2012)
 Beylerbeyi Sports Club (2011–2012)
 Besiktas JK (2012–2013)
 Victory Rock Prep (2014–2017)
 Arkansas University (2017–2020)

Professional career

Petkim Spor (2020–2021)
On August 5, 2020, he has signed with Petkim Spor of the Basketbol Süper Ligi (BSL).

Galatasaray (2021–2022)
On 11 August 2021, he has signed with BSL club Galatasaray Nef.

Darüşşafaka (2022–present)
On June 8, 2022, he has signed with Darüşşafaka of the Basketbol Süper Ligi (BSL).

References

External links
Canberk Kuş TBLStat.net Profile
Canberk Kuş TBL Profile

Living people
1996 births
Galatasaray S.K. (men's basketball) players
Petkim Spor players
Small forwards
Turkish men's basketball players
21st-century Turkish people